Subzero, nicknamed "Subbie" (26 September 1988 – 29 August 2020), was an Australian thoroughbred racehorse that won the 1992 Melbourne Cup.

Life and career
Subzero was foaled in Australia. Trained by Lee Freedman and ridden by veteran jockey Greg Hall, the four-year-old revelled in the rain-affected going in the 1992 Melbourne Cup to defeat the favourite, Veandercross, and the two-miler Castletown. The win was to be Subzero's last, but as one of the few grey winners of the race in the post-War era, his fame was assured.

Upon retirement from racing, Subzero was employed as the clerk of the course's horse by Racing Victoria's long-time clerk, Graham Salisbury, and made numerous appearances on television, at charity functions and schools. In July 2008, he was fully retired as he had developed arthritis.

In October 2009, it was reported that Subzero might need to be put down as the medication he needed for his arthritis became unavailable in Australia. The medication was subsequently sourced from the United States and Subzero continued to appear in public. In his retirement he was gentle natured, very patient with children and remained with Graham Salisbury until Salisbury's death in June 2020.

On 29 August 2020, he was euthanized at the Bendigo Equine Hospital due to the onset of heart failure. He was 31.

See also
 List of millionaire racehorses in Australia
 List of Melbourne Cup winners

References

Further reading

External links
 Product-maker flies the Pacific to help ailing Cup winner - Horsetalk.co.nz 1.11.09
 Subzero's pedigree and partial racing stats
Subzero visiting the Living Legends park

1988 racehorse births
2020 racehorse deaths
Racehorses bred in Australia
Racehorses trained in Australia
Melbourne Cup winners
Thoroughbred family 4-m